Shaquille Dyer (born 10 August 1995) is a Jamaican footballer who last played for Harrisburg City Islanders in the USL on loan from Arnett Gardens FC of the Red Stripe Premier League.

Career
Dyer started his playing career at Arnett Gardens FC in Kingston, Jamaica where he  served as team captain for U-20 squad for the 2014 season.  He was promoted to Arnett Gardens FC’s first team in the 2014 season and became established as a starting player during the 2015 season.

In 2015, Dyer secured a loan deal to play with Harrisburg City Islanders of the USL for the remainder of the 2015 season. He debuted for the Islanders on 18 July 2015 against the New York Red Bulls II. Dyer made a total of six appearances for the club but was not signed by the Islanders for the 2016 season.

International
Dyer was a member of the Jamaica National U-20 Team that recently competed at the 2015 CONCACAF U-20 Championship held in Kingston in January 2015. He is also currently a member of the Jamaica U23 Olympic Pool.

References

1995 births
Living people
Jamaican footballers
Jamaica youth international footballers
Penn FC players
Association football defenders
USL Championship players
2015 CONCACAF U-20 Championship players
Jamaica under-20 international footballers